Jotham was a King of Judah in the Hebrew Bible.

Jotham or Yotam may also refer to:

Given name

Jotham
Jotham (son of Gideon), a character in the Hebrew Bible
Jotham P. Allds, American politician
Jotham Blanchard, Canadian politician
Jotham Johnson, American archaeologist
Jotham Meeker, American missionary
Jotham Post, Jr., American politician
Jotham Tumwesigye, Ugandan judge
Jotham Gay, Nova Scotian political figure

Yotam
Yotam Ben Horin, Israeli musician
Yotam Halperin (born 1984), Israeli basketball player
Yotam Ottolenghi, Israeli chef and restaurant owner
Yotam Solomon, Israeli fashion designer
Yotam Tepper, Israeli archaeologist

Surname
Eustace Jotham, English soldier

Other uses
Jotham W. Wakeman Public School Number 6, school in New Jersey